ANSI/ASA S1.1-2013, published by the American National Standards Institute (ANSI), is the current American National Standard on Acoustical Terminology. ANSI S1.1 was first published in 1960 and has its roots in a 1942 standard published by the American Standards Association, the predecessor of ANSI.  It includes the following sections

Scope 
 General 
 Levels 
 Oscillation, vibration, and shock 
 Transmission and propagation 
 Transducers and linear systems 
 Acoustical apparatus and instruments 
 Underwater acoustics 
 Sonics and ultrasonic testing 
 Architectural acoustics 
 Physiological and psychological acoustics 
 Musical acoustics

External links

 ANSI/ASA S1.1 & S3.20 Standard Acoustical & Bioacoustical Terminology Database
 ANSI website

References

+
American National Standards Institute standards